Anne Marsh is  an Australian feminist art theorist.  she is professorial research fellow at the Victorian College of the Arts.

Career
Originally trained as a sculptor in the 1970s, Marsh first was involved with sculpture performances often identified with the emerging feminist art movement in Australia, and was a member of the Women's Art Movement. She also belonged to the group of women artists who worked upon the Lip magazine.

Marsh is well known as a feminist art theorist and has published many essays, journal articles, exhibition catalogues and reviews in Australia and internationally. Monograph publications include a survey of performance art in Australia Body and Self: Performance Art in Australia, 1969–1992 and photography and modernism from the nineteenth century onwards – The Darkroom: Photography and the Theatre of Desire

She has also received Australian Research Council (ARC) Discovery grants as sole researcher and as part of a team around the areas of photography, video and performance.

In 2017 she did a three-month residency at the Norma Redpath House and Studios.

 she is professorial research fellow at the Victorian College of the Arts.

Works 
Performance, Ritual, Document (2014) Macmillan
Look! Contemporary Australian Photography (2010) Macmillan
Pat Brassington: This is Not a Photograph, (2006) Quintus an imprint of the University of Tasmania
The Darkroom : photography and the theatre of desire  (2003) Macmillan
 Body and self : performance art in Australia 1969-92 (1993) Oxford University Press

References

External links

Living people
Academic staff of the University of Melbourne
University of Melbourne women
20th-century Australian sculptors
Australian women non-fiction writers
20th-century Australian women